A by-election was held for the Australian House of Representatives seat of Werriwa on 29 November 1952. This was triggered by the death of Labor Party MP Bert Lazzarini.

The by-election was won by Labor Party candidate and future Prime Minister Gough Whitlam.

Results

See also
 List of Australian federal by-elections

References

1952 elections in Australia
New South Wales federal by-elections
Gough Whitlam